Clear Creek Amana High School, or CCA High School, is a public senior high school in Tiffin, Iowa and a part of the Clear Creek–Amana Community School District. It serves the entire district.

A Clipper Ship is the school mascot.

The school will receive an addition as part of a bond program.

History
The school was formed after the Clear Creek Community School District and the Amana Community School District entered into a whole grade sharing arrangement, consolidating Clear Creek High School and Amana High School. Its initial enrollment was 210, with 60 being in the 9th grade. 10 total students originated from outside the Clear Creek and Amana districts (from the previous year) and 50 total previously attended Amana High School.

Tom McAreavy served as principal of this school and the predecessor school Clear Creek High from circa 1980 until 1995. Tom McDonald took over the position.

Shive-Hattery, Inc. designed a new facility for 600 students. The current high school building opened in 2009, with the former high school building converted into a middle school housing sixth- through eighth-grade students; both facilities are located in Tiffin. There were 500 students at that time. The former high school, which was built and opened in the late 1960s, had served as Clear Creek High School prior to 1990, and was a junior-senior high school facility. In 2016 the district planned to add an addition to the west wing, with Portzen Construction of Dubuque, Iowa being given a $7.8 million contract.

In 2019 the district leadership decided that the old campus was too small and it needed a new campus by 2027, with the current campus becoming a middle school.

Operations
In 1990 the school had eight periods per day, while the previous Clear Creek High had seven periods.

Curriculum
In 1990 the school had German and Spanish as foreign languages classes available, which were not available at Clear Creek High.

Athletics
Athletic teams are known as the Clippers, but to date the ship remains symbolic; no actual mascot is present at school functions. At the Amana Elementary, inside the gym, there is an old indication that the school's mascot was the Rockets. The school song is "Anchors Aweigh" and is played at pep rallies and athletic events, as well as school events. CCA participates in 15 sports in the WaMaC Conference. The school is well known for its softball program, making it to the state softball tournament 34 times, more than any other high school in Iowa, and winning 9 state titles (as of the finish of the 2018 season).

State championships
 Softball 
 Summer (1973, 1975, 1997, 2002, 2004, 2006, 2009, 2011)
 Fall (1972, 1973)

See also
List of high schools in Iowa

References

External links
 Official Site

Public high schools in Iowa
Schools in Johnson County, Iowa
Educational institutions established in 1990
1990 establishments in Iowa
Educational institutions established in 1995
1995 establishments in Iowa